NEBB may refer to:

 National Environmental Balancing Bureau
 Norsk Elektrisk & Brown Boveri (Norwegian manufacturing company; now defunct.)